Nvidia GameWorks is a middleware software suite developed by Nvidia. The Visual FX, PhysX and Optix SDKs provide a wide range of enhancements pre-optimized for Nvidia GPUs. GameWorks is partially open-source. The competing solution being in development by AMD is GPUOpen, which was announced to be free and open-source software under the MIT License.

Components
Nvidia Gameworks consists of several main components:

 VisualFX: For rendering effects such as smoke, fire, water, depth of field, soft shadows, HBAO+, TXAA, FaceWorks and HairWorks.
 PhysX: For physics, destruction, particle and fluid simulations.
 OptiX: For baked lighting and general-purpose ray-tracing.
 Core SDK: For facilitating development on Nvidia hardware.

In addition, the suite contains sample code for DirectX and OpenGL developers, as well as tools for debugging, profiling, optimization and Android development.

See also
 PhysX
 GPUOpen
 TressFX
 Havok (software)

References

External links
 Nvidia GameWorks

Free and open-source software
Middleware for video games
Nvidia software
Video game development software